VV Sliedrecht is a football club from Sliedrecht, Netherlands. VV Sliedrecht plays in the 2019–20 season in Saturday Eerste Klasse C.

In recent years, VV Sliedrecht plays mostly in the Eerste Klasse. In 2016, it was runner up in the Eerste Klasse after narrowly losing the championship to SV DFS. Sliedrecht nevertheless made it to the Hoofdklasse through playoffs and relegated after just one season.

Former players
 Mohamed Sharif - Somalia international
Stefan van Dam – youth, then 1st section 2011–2017

References

External links
 Official site

Football clubs in the Netherlands
Football clubs in South Holland
Sport in Sliedrecht
Association football clubs established in 1912
1912 establishments in the Netherlands